Sam Macaroni (born March 14, 1975 in San Jose, California) is an actor, film director, and writer. He wrote, directed and stars in National Lampoon's TV: The Movie. In the film, he plays Jeffrey Sutton, Dick Weston Fernandez and Chad (in You're in the Army Now).

Personal life 
He grew up in Yosemite Valley, California where he had a lot of natural space all around him. He began his filming career at the age of eleven when he earned his first video camera doing odd jobs. He has lived in Hollywood, Los Angeles since 1994, and has no children.

Career 
He studied at the Stella Adler Studio of Acting in Los Angeles.

He stars in ThinkFilm's Gangsta Rap: The Glockumentary along with Clifton Powell and rapper Too Short.

He was a writer for the 2006 Billboard Music Awards as well as a music video director for MCA/Universal Records. At age 24, Maccarone sold a show to MTV called "Disco Masters" which starred Sam as a disco dancing, beer drinking superhero.

He plays Billy in Les Claypool's directorial debut Electric Apricot: Quest for Festeroo.

In 2007, he was a guest on The Howard Stern Show.

In 2009, he starred in a Starbucks Via national television commercial as Roger the airline pilot.

On November 17, 2009, he appeared in an episode of The Forgotten on ABC.

He wrote and directed Guest house in 2020

He directed blackout in 2022

References

1975 births
American male comedians
American male film actors
American music video directors
American male screenwriters
American writers of Italian descent
Living people
People from Mariposa County, California
Male actors from California
Comedians from California
Screenwriters from California
21st-century American comedians
21st-century American screenwriters
21st-century American male writers